Saussurea americana is a species of flowering plant in the family Asteraceae known by the common name American saw-wort. It is native to northwestern North America from Alaska to far northern California to Montana, where it grows in mountain habitat, such as meadows and forests. It is a perennial herb producing one or more hairy, glandular, erect stems up to a meter tall or more from a thick caudex. The lance-shaped leaves are up to 15 centimeters long and have toothed edges, especially the larger lower leaves. The inflorescence is a cluster of several flower heads, each a bullet-shaped body covered in purple or purple-tinged green phyllaries. The head opens at the tip to bloom with several white to purple tubular disc florets; there are no ray florets. The fruit is an achene tipped with a pappus, the whole unit sometimes exceeding a centimeter in length.

External links

Jepson Manual Treatment
USDA Plants Profile
Flora of North America
Washington Burke Museum

americana